Spring Creek Cave is a cave in Kendall County, near Boerne, Texas, that is not open to the public. It is known for its fossil specimens and a three-mile-long underground river, which sometimes floods out into Spring Creek after heavy rains.

References

Caves of Texas
Landforms of Kendall County, Texas